Uluköy is a village in the Kızıltepe District of Mardin Province in Turkey. The village is populated by Kurds of the Xurs tribe and by Kurdophone Mhallami. It had population of 297 in 2021.

References 

Villages in Kızıltepe District
Kurdish settlements in Mardin Province
Mhallami villages